Richland is a ghost town in Vinton County, in the U.S. state of Ohio. The GNIS classifies it as a populated place.

History
An old variant name of Richland was Richland Furnace. Richland Furnace was a blast furnace completed in 1854. A post office called Richland was established in 1872, and remained in operation until 1914.

References

Unincorporated communities in Vinton County, Ohio
Unincorporated communities in Ohio

Ghost towns in Ohio